Dieppe Park may refer to:

 Dieppe Park, Montreal
 Dieppe Park, one of the Parks in Windsor, Ontario